The 1991 Grote Prijs Jef Scherens was the 25th edition of the Grote Prijs Jef Scherens cycle race and was held on 22 September 1991. The race started and finished in Leuven. The race was won by Wilco Zuijderwijk.

General classification

References

1991
1991 in road cycling
1991 in Belgian sport